John Mitchum (September 6, 1919 – November 29, 2001) was an American actor from the 1940s to the 1970s in film and television. The younger brother of the actor Robert Mitchum, he was credited as Jack Mitchum early in his career.

Early years 
Mitchum was born in Bridgeport, Connecticut, to Ann Harriet Mitchum (née Gunderson) and James Thomas Mitchum, who had been killed in a railyard accident seven months earlier. He was the younger brother of Julie Mitchum and Robert Mitchum. He served in the United States Army, 361st Harbor Craft Company, in Florida and Hawaii.

Career
Mitchum initially appeared unbilled in (e.g., Flying Leathernecks, RKO 1951) and extra roles before gradually receiving bigger character parts. He supported his more famous brother on several occasions, and became known as the friendly, food-loving Inspector Frank DiGiorgio in the first three Dirty Harry films. His character was killed in the third film, The Enforcer.

In 1957, he had a short appearance on Gunsmoke as a dueling cowboy in the episode “Sweet and Sour” (S2E23).  He returned two years later portraying “Joe” in “The Constable” (S4E37) and again in 1963 as “Wills” in “Two of a Kind” (S8E27).

In 1958, Mitchum was cast in two episodes of the crime drama Richard Diamond, Private Detective, starring David Janssen. He played Joe in the episode "Short Haul" and Jimmy Logan in "Bungalow Murder".

On September 15, 1959, Mitchum appeared in the premiere episode "Stage Stop" of the Western series Laramie.

Mitchum was cast in 1960 as Pickalong in 10 episodes of the Western series Riverboat, starring Darren McGavin. The same year, he appeared in the Western series The Rebel, starring Nick Adams. He also appeared as Hal Swanson in the 1960 episode "Silver Killers" of the Western series Tombstone Territory.
Mitcham appeared in the 1960 Tales of Wells Fargo episode, "A Show for Silver Lode", in the role of a Wells Fargo station agent.
From 1965 to 1967, Mitchum had the recurring role of Trooper Hoffenmueller in 11 episodes of the sitcom F Troop, starring Forrest Tucker, Larry Storch, and Ken Berry. In the 1967 episode of Batman "Surf's Up! Joker's Under!", he guest-starred as the character Hot Dog Harrigan.
 
Mitchum was a writer, poet, singer, and guitar player. An autobiography/biography about his life and career and that of his brother Robert was published in 1998, called Them Ornery Mitchum Boys. He composed the piece "America, Why I Love Her", which John Wayne included in his book and album of the same name. The piece and a short film with Wayne's narration were aired at many television stations at sign-off time before stations began broadcasting 24 hours a day in the late 1970s and early 1980s. Wayne is often mistakenly credited with composing the piece.

Personal life
Mitchum was married four times, first to Joy Hallward, older sister of film noir femme fatale Gloria Grahame.

Mitchum died on November 29, 2001, after complications of three strokes. He was 82.

Selected filmography

With Clint Eastwood 

 Paint Your Wagon (1969) – Jacob Woodling
 Dirty Harry (1971) –  Frank De Georgio
 High Plains Drifter (1973) – Warden
 Magnum Force (1973) –  Frank De Georgio
 The Outlaw Josey Wales (1976) – Al
 The Enforcer (1976) –  Frank De Georgio

Other appearances

 The Prairie (1947) – Asa Bush 
 Shed No Tears (1948) – Policeman (uncredited)
 Knock on Any Door (1949) – Jury Member (uncredited)
 The Devil's Sleep (1949) – Interne
 When Willie Comes Marching Home (1950) – Schreves (scenes deleted)
 In a Lonely Place (1950) – Bar Patron (uncredited)
 Born to Be Bad (1950) – Guest (uncredited)
 Right Cross (1950) – Sixth Reporter (uncredited)
 Flying Leathernecks (1951) – Lt. Black (uncredited)
 Submarine Command (1951) – Bert (uncredited)
 The Pace That Thrills (1952) – Blackie Meyers 
 One Minute to Zero (1952) – Artillery Spotter (uncredited)
 The Lusty Men (1952) – Jack Nemo (uncredited)
 Stalag 17 (1953) – Prisoner of War (uncredited)
 Lucy Gallant (1955) – One of Casey's Air Force Buddies (uncredited)
 The Rawhide Years (1955) – Card Player (uncredited)
 Perils of the Wilderness (1956) – Brent
 The Bold and the Brave (1956) – G.I. in Bar (uncredited)
 Nightmare (1956) – Onlooker at Stan's Suicide Attempt (uncredited)
 The Man Is Armed (1956) – Officer
 Man in the Vault (1956) – Andy (uncredited)
 5 Steps to Danger (1957) – Deputy
 Operation Mad Ball (1957) – Enlisted Man (uncredited)
 Black Patch (1957) – Saloon Dealer (uncredited)
 Death in Small Doses (1957) – Truck Consignment Man (uncredited)
 Ride Out for Revenge (1957) – Sergeant (uncredited)
 The Tall Stranger (1957) – Porter (uncredited)
 Up in Smoke (1957) – Desk Sergeant
 The Restless Gun (1958) in Episode "The Coward"
 Cole Younger, Gunfighter (1958) – Rand City Bartender
 Hell's Five Hours (1958) – Roadblock Officer (uncredited)
 Quantrill's Raiders (1958) – Sergeant (uncredited)
 The Bonnie Parker Story (1958) – John – Saloon Owner / Bartender (uncredited)
 Revolt in the Big House (1958) – Guard (uncredited)
 Johnny Rocco (1958) – Police Detective at Stakeout (uncredited)
 Guns Girls and Gangsters (1959) – Armored Car Guard (uncredited)
 Al Capone (1959) – Photographer (uncredited)
 The Gunfight at Dodge City (1959) – Rowdy Drunken Cowboy (uncredited)
 Battle Flame (1959) – Maj. Dowling
 The Sergeant Was a Lady (1961) – MP #1
 Hitler (1962) – Hermann Goering
 The Virginian (1963 episode "Echo of Another Day") as Madison
 Cattle King (1963) – Tex
 My Fair Lady (1964) – Ad Lib at Church (uncredited)
 Brainstorm (1965) – Guitar-Playing Inmate (uncredited)
 Seconds (1966) – Truck Driver (uncredited)
 The Plainsman (1966) – Townsman (uncredited)
 Warning Shot (1967) – Reporter at Apartment (uncredited)
 The Way West (1967) – Little Henry
 El Dorado (1967) – Elmer – Jason's Bartender (uncredited)
 Three Guns for Texas (1968) – George (uncredited)
 Bandolero! (1968) – Bath House Barber
 Chisum (1970) – Baker
 Bigfoot (1970) – Elmer Briggs
 One More Train to Rob (1971) – Guard (uncredited)
 Do Not Fold, Spindle, or Mutilate (1971) – Mr. Tubbs
 Chandler (1971) – Rudy, Bartender
 Bloody Trail (1972) – Hoss
 The World Through the Eyes of Children (1975) – Preacher
 Breakheart Pass (1975) – Red Beard
 Pipe Dreams (1976) – Franklin
 Telefon (1977) – Harry Bascom
 Where's Willie? (1978)
 Jake Spanner, Private Eye (1989) – J.P. Spanner

References

External links

1919 births
2001 deaths
20th-century American guitarists
20th-century American male actors
20th-century American male musicians
American male film actors
American male guitarists
American male television actors
American people of English descent
American people of Irish descent
American people of Norwegian descent
American people of Scotch-Irish descent
American people of Scottish descent
Guitarists from Connecticut
Male actors from Bridgeport, Connecticut
Male actors from Los Angeles
Mitchum family